Myriam Boileau (born November 23, 1977, in Montreal, Quebec) is a Canadian diver. She began diving at the age of ten, and studied at the Université de Montréal. Boileau is one of the many divers from the world-famous Club de Plongeon CAMO, operating out of the Complexe sportif Claude-Robillard in Montreal.

Career
She won the first international competition for Canada since 1984's Sylvie Bernier at the FINA World Cup of Mexico City, September 1997. She won a bronze medal in the Canada Cup, 2002 in the 10m platform. She finished seventh on the 10m platform diving event at the 2004 Summer Olympics. She has recently retired from competitive diving.

References

 sports-reference - Myriam Boileau

1977 births
Canadian female divers
Commonwealth Games bronze medallists for Canada
Commonwealth Games silver medallists for Canada
Divers at the 1994 Commonwealth Games
Divers at the 1998 Commonwealth Games
Divers at the 2004 Summer Olympics
Living people
Olympic divers of Canada
Divers from Montreal
Commonwealth Games medallists in diving
20th-century Canadian women
Medallists at the 1994 Commonwealth Games
Medallists at the 1998 Commonwealth Games